Julie Ivalo Broberg Berthelsen also known by her mononym Julie (born 7 June 1979) is a Danish-born Greenlandic pop singer and songwriter. She is known largely for her success on the TV series Popstars. Although she finished in second place, she has become more popular and successful than the first-place winner. She grew up in Nuuk, the capital of Greenland.

Julie has given a variety of performances, the most noteworthy of which was at Christiansborg Palace, in front of the Danish Royal family for the wedding of Crown Prince Frederik and Crown Princess Mary in May 2004. Another performance worthy of note was her rendition of the Beatles song "Ob-La-Di, Ob-La-Da" on 22 November 2008 at The White Concert, held in Horsens, Denmark on the 40th anniversary of the release of "The Beatles" (a.k.a. "The White Album").

Discography 
Albums
2003: Home
2004: Julie
2006: Asasara
2009: Lige nu
2010: Closer

Singles
2002: "Every Little Part of Me"
2003: "Shout (Our Love Will Be the Light)"
2003: "Completely Fallen"
2004: "It's a Wonderful Feeling"
2014: "Jesus and Josephine" (with Martin Brygmann)

References

External links 

 Biography of Julie Berthelsen on inuit.uqam.ca
Official homepage

1979 births
Greenlandic women singers
Greenlandic actresses
Greenlandic people of Danish descent
Living people
People from Nuuk
English-language singers from Greenland
21st-century Danish  women singers